Audrey Hepburn wore a "little black dress" in the 1961 romantic comedy film Breakfast at Tiffany's. The garment was designed by Hubert de Givenchy, and is worn during the opening scene of the film. The dress is referred to as one of the most iconic clothing items in the history of the twentieth century, and perhaps the most famous little black dress of all time.

History
Audrey Hepburn was a close friend of French designer Givenchy, referring to the designer as her "best friend" while he considered her his "sister".

 
In 1961, Givenchy designed a little black dress for the opening scene of Blake Edwards' romantic comedy, Breakfast at Tiffany's, in which Hepburn starred alongside actor George Peppard. Her necklace was made by Roger Scemama, a French jeweler and parure-maker who designed jewelry for Givenchy. Hepburn took two copies of the dress back to Paramount, but the dresses, which revealed a considerable amount of Hepburn's leg, were not suitable for the movie, and the lower half of the dress was redesigned by Edith Head. The original hand-stitched dress is currently in Givenchy's private archive, whilst one copy Hepburn took back to Paramount is on display at the Museo del Traje in Madrid and another was auctioned at Christie's in December 2006. None of the actual dresses created by Givenchy were used in either the movie or the promotional photography. The movie poster was designed by artist Robert McGinnis, and in Sam Wasson's book, Fifth Avenue, 5am, he explains that the photos on which he based the poster did not show any leg and that he had added the leg to make the poster more appealing. The actual dresses used in the movie, created by Edith Head, were probably destroyed by Head and Hepburn at Western Costume in California after shooting.

In November 2006, Natalie Portman appeared on the cover of Harper's Bazaar, wearing one of the original Givenchy dresses created for Breakfast at Tiffany's. On 5 December 2006, this dress was auctioned at Christie's in London and purchased by an anonymous buyer by telephone. The sale price was estimated by the auction house to have ended somewhere between £50,000 and £70,000, but the final price was £467,200 ($923,187). The money raised in the auction of the black dress went toward helping build a school for the poor people of Calcutta. It so happened that Givenchy, the designer of the dress, had donated the dress to Dominique Lapierre, the author of the book City of Joy, and his wife to help raise funds for the charity. When they witnessed such a frenzied auction, the amount that was raised so astonished Lapierre that he observed, "I'm absolutely dumbfounded to believe that a piece of cloth which belonged to such a magical actress will now enable me to buy bricks and cement to put the most destitute children in the world into schools."
Sarah Hodgson, a film specialist at Christie's said, "This is one of the most famous black dresses in the world—an iconic piece of cinematic history—and we are glad it fetched a historic price."

Design
The model is a Givenchy black Italian satin sheath evening gown. Christie's describes it as "a sleeveless, floor-length gown with fitted bodice embellished at the back with distinctive cut-out décolleté, the skirt slightly gathered at the waist and slit to the thigh on one side, labelled inside on the waistband Givenchy; accompanied by a pair of black elbow-length gloves". The bodice is slightly open at the back with a neckline that leaves uncovered shoulders. In the film, Audrey Hepburn wears a matching pair of elbow-length gloves the same colour and strings of pearls. The look has been described as "ultra-feminine" and "Parisian".

The little black dress attained such iconic fame and status that it became an integral part of a woman's wardrobe. Givenchy not only chose the dress for the character in the film, but also added the right accessories to match the long gown in the form of a pearl choker of many strands, a foot long cigarette holder, a large black hat and opera gloves which not only "visually defined the character but indelibly linked Audrey with her".

Given her physical assets, she, along with her designer friend Givenchy, created a dress to fit her role in the film of a waif. A well chosen black silk dress with appropriate accessories hit the bull's eye to bring her effervescent personality to the fore; the dark oversized sunglasses completed the ensemble of the little black dress (LBD) which was called "the definitive LBD". The dress, which outlined her lean shoulder blades, thus became the Hepburn style.

Reception
The dress is cited as one of the most iconic of the 20th century and film history. It has been described as "perhaps the most famous little black dress of all time" and exerting a major influence on fashion itself by directly making it popular.

In a survey conducted in 2010 by LOVEFiLM, Hepburn's little black dress was chosen as the best dress ever worn by a woman in a film. In this respect, Helen Cowley, publisher of LOVEFiLM, declared: "Audrey Hepburn has truly made that little black dress a fashion staple which has stood the test of time despite competition from some of the most stylish females around." Hepburn's white dress and hat worn in My Fair Lady was voted sixth.

Hepburn's little black dress (LBD) has been copied and parodied numerous times in other works worldwide, such as Natalie Portman in a 2006 Harper’s Bazaar cover shoot and Lee Ji-eun in Hotel del Luna.

See also 
 White floral Givenchy dress of Audrey Hepburn
 Black dress of Rita Hayworth
 Pink dress of Marilyn Monroe
 White dress of Marilyn Monroe
 List of film memorabilia
 List of individual dresses

References

Further reading
Tony Nourmand and Audrey Hepburn, The Paramount Years London, Westbourne Press Ltd, 2006, pp. 94–127.
Sean Hepburn Ferrer, Audrey Hepburn: An Elegant Spirit – A Son Remembers, Sidgwick and Jackson, 2003, pp. 155–160.

1960s fashion
1961 clothing
Dresses in film
Audrey Hepburn
Film memorabilia
Givenchy, Hepburn